Salaf ("ancestors" or "predecessors"), also often referred to with the honorific expression of "al-salaf al-ṣāliḥ" ("the pious predecessors") are often taken to be the first three generations of Muslims. This comprises companions of the prophet Muhammad (the ), their followers (the ), and the followers of the followers (the ). Their religious significance lay in the statement attributed to The prophet Muhammad ﷺ: "The best of my community are my generation, the ones who follow them and the ones who follow them", a period believed to exemplify the pure form of Islam.

Second generation
The Tabi‘un, the successors of Sahabah. 

 Abu Hanifah Nuʿmān ibn Thābit ibn Zūṭā ibn Marzubān
 Abu Muslim Al-Khawlani
 Abu Suhail an-Nafi' ibn 'Abd ar-Rahman
 Al-Rabi Ibn Khuthaym
 Ali Akbar
 Ali ibn Husayn (Zain-ul-'Abidin)
 Alqama ibn Qays al-Nakha'i
 Ata Ibn Abi Rabah
 Atiyya bin Saad
 Hasan al-Basri
 Iyas Ibn Muawiyah Al-Muzani
 Masruq ibn al-Ajda'
 Muhammad al-Baqir
 Muhammad ibn al-Hanafiyyah
 Muhammad Ibn Wasi' Al-Azdi
 Muhammad ibn Muslim ibn Shihab al-Zuhri
 Muhammad ibn Munkadir
 Nafi Mawla Ibn Umar
 Muhammad ibn Sirin, son of a slave of Khalid ibn al-Walid
 Musa ibn Nusayr
 Qasim ibn Muhammad ibn Abi Bakr
 Raja ibn Haywa
 Sa'id ibn Jubayr
 Said ibn al-Musayyib
 Salamah ibn Dinar
 Salih Ibn Ashyam Al-Adawi
 Salim Ibn Abdullah Ibn Umar Ibn al-Khattab
 Shuraih Al-Qadhi
 Tariq Ibn Ziyad
 Tawus Ibn Kaysan
 Umar Ibn Abdul-Aziz
 Umm Kulthum bint Abu Bakr
 Urwah Ibn Al-Zubayr
 Uwais al-Qarni

Third generation
The Tabi‘ al-Tabi‘in, the successors of the Tabi‘un. 

 Abd al-Rahman al-Ghafiqi
 Ja'far al-Sadiq, grandson of Ali ibn Hussain 
 Malik ibn Anas
 Muhammad al-Nafs al-Zakiyya
 Muhammad bin Qasim
 Rabi'a al-'Adawiyya al-Qaysiyya
 Muhammad ibn Idris al-Shafi'i
 Zayd ibn Ali
 Ishaq ibn Rahwayh
 Al-Layth ibn Sa'd

See also
 List of Sahaba
 Non-Muslims who interacted with Muslims during Muhammad's era
 Salafi movement

References

 
Salaf
 
Islamic terminology